Amy Justine Turner  (born 25 March 1984) is an Australian rugby union and rugby league footballer. 

In rugby sevens, she represented Australia, winning a gold medal at the 2016 Summer Olympics in Rio de Janeiro. In rugby league, she played for the Brisbane Broncos, winning an NRL Women's Premiership, and representing Queensland.

Background
Born in Tokoroa, New Zealand, Turner is of Māori descent, and affiliates to the Tainui iwi (tribe). Growing up in Tokoroa, she played rugby league.

Playing career

Rugby union
Turner represented both the New Zealand Maori Sevens and the New Zealand Touch Football teams, before moving to Australia. Playing as a utility, Turner earned her first call up to the Australian Women's Sevens for the Houston leg of the 2012–13 IRB Women's Sevens World Series. Turner was a member of the squad that won the Dubai and São Paulo legs in the 2013–14 IRB Women's Sevens World Series. She also played a pivotal role as Australia won the London leg of the World Series in May 2015. Turner also scored a try in the 2014 World Cup.  She was a member of Australia's team at the 2016 Olympics, defeating New Zealand in the final to win the inaugural Olympic gold medal in the sport.

Rugby league
In 2019, Turner returned to rugby league, playing for the Wests Panthers. In May 2019, she represented South East Queensland at the Women's National Championships. On 21 June 2019, she made her State of Origin debut for Queensland, coming off the bench in a 4–14 loss to New South Wales.

On 4 July 2019, she signed with the Brisbane Broncos NRL Women's Premiership team. In Round 1 of the 2019 NRL Women's season, she made her debut for the Broncos in a 14–4 win over the St George Illawarra Dragons.

In 2020, Turner missed the entire season due the birth of her second child.

On 20 February 2021, Turner represented the Māori All Stars, scoring a try in their 24–0 win over the Indigenous All Stars.

See also

List of players who have converted from one football code to another

References

External links
 

1984 births
Australian female rugby union players
Australian female rugby sevens players
Living people
Rugby sevens players at the 2016 Summer Olympics
Olympic rugby sevens players of Australia
Touch footballers
New Zealand Māori sportspeople
Olympic gold medalists for Australia
Olympic medalists in rugby sevens
Medalists at the 2016 Summer Olympics
Waikato Tainui people
Rugby union players from Tokoroa
New Zealand emigrants to Australia
New Zealand Māori rugby league players
Australia international rugby sevens players
Australian female rugby league players
Australia women's national rugby league team players
Brisbane Broncos (NRLW) players
Recipients of the Medal of the Order of Australia
20th-century Australian women
21st-century Australian women